True most commonly refers to truth, the state of being in congruence with fact or reality.

True may also refer to:

Places
 True, West Virginia, an unincorporated community in the United States
 True, Wisconsin, a town in the United States
 True, a townland in County Tyrone, Northern Ireland

People
 True (singer) (stylized as TRUE), the stage name of Japanese singer Miho Karasawa
 True (surname)
 True O'Brien (born 1994), an American model and actress

Arts, entertainment, and media

Music

Albums
 True (Avicii album), 2013
 True (EP), a 2012 EP by Solange Knowles
 True (L'Arc-en-Ciel album), 1996
 True (Roy Montgomery and Chris Heaphy album), 1999
 True (Mika Nakashima album), 2002
 True (Spandau Ballet album), 1983
 True (TrinityRoots album), 2001
 True (TRU album), 1995

Songs
 "True" (Brandy song), by Brandy Norwood from Human (2008)
 "True" (Concrete Blonde song), 1987
 "True" (Ryan Cabrera song), 2004
 "True" (Jaimeson song), 2003
 "True" (Spandau Ballet song), 1983
 "True" (George Strait song), 1998 
"True", a song by Cindy Walker, recorded on The International Jim Reeves 1963
 "True", by Lasgo from Far Away
 "True", by Zion I from True & Livin'
 "True...", a 2001 song by Riyu Kosaka
 "True Song", a 2002 song by Do As Infinity
 "You Don't Love Me (True)", a song by Louis Cottrell Jr. with Don Albert and Lloyd Glenn

Periodicals
 True (magazine), an American men's magazine
 Trace (magazine), formerly True, a British hip-hop magazine

Other uses in arts, entertainment, and media
 True (film), a short film directed by Tom Tykwer, starring Natalie Portman
 True, a 2013 Elixir novel by Hilary Duff with Elise Allen, a sequel to Devoted
 GE True, an anthology TV series based on stories from True magazine
 True, the main protagonist from the Netflix animated series True and the Rainbow Kingdom

Computing
 true (Unix), a Unix utility
 true, a boolean value
 TRUE (Temporal Reasoning Universal Elaboration), a discrete and continuous time simulation software program for 2D, 3D and 4D modeling

Brands and enterprises
 True (cigarette), a brand of cigarettes made by Lorillard Tobacco Company
 True (dating service), an online dating service
 True Corporation, a Thai communications group
 TrueMove H, a Thai mobile operator
 TrueVisions, a Thai television platform

Other uses
 True self
 True value, a concept in statistics
 Trust for Urban Ecology, a British ecological organisation

See also
 TRU (band), an American hip hop group
 True north (disambiguation)
 Truth value, in logic and mathematics, a logical value
 False (disambiguation), the opposite of true
 Wheel truing stand